Khachemzy is a rural locality (an aul) in Dmitriyevskoye Rural Settlement of Koshekhablsky District, Adygea, Russia. The population was 672 as of 2018. There are 16 streets.

Geography 
The aul is located on the left bank of the Fars River, 19 km northwest of Koshekhabl (the district's administrative centre) by road. Otradny is the nearest rural locality.

Ethnicity 
The settlement is inhabited by Adighes.

References 

Rural localities in Koshekhablsky District